Villains is the second studio album, and first major label release by the Verve Pipe. It was released in March 1996. The band received its first hit in "Photograph", which peaked in the top 10 on the Billboard Modern Rock Tracks. A year after the release of the album, a reformatted version of "The Freshmen" peaked at number 1 on the Modern Rock Tracks chart. The single was also the band's sole appearance on the Billboard Hot 100, where it peaked at number 5. The success of the song helped this album go platinum. To date, it is the Verve Pipe's best selling album.

Track listing

Personnel
Adapted from the Villains booklet and liner notes.

The Verve Pipe
Brian Vander Ark – Lead vocals, rhythm guitar
Brad Vander Ark – Bass guitar, backing vocals
Donny Brown – Drums, backing vocals
A.J. Dunning – Lead guitar, backing vocals
Doug Corella – Keyboards, percussion

Artwork
Sean Mosher-Smith – Art Direction, Design
Aldo Mauro – Band Photography
Slow HEARTH – Bird Photography

Management
Doug Buttleman – Management for The Fitzgerald Hartley Company
Fred Bohlander – Booking for Monterey Peninsula Artists
Howard B. Abrams – Legal

Production
Jerry Harrison – Producer
Brian Malouf – A&R  
Jason Rio, Philip "Mac" Ward – Coordinators 
Douglas Biro & Ria Lewerke – Creative Directors
Karl Derfler – Engineer
Doug McKean – Additional Editing 
Larry "Hot" Brewer – Additional engineering
Chris Buttleman – Guitar Technician
Ted Jensen – Mastering at Sterling Sound, New York, NY
Tom Lord-Alge – Mixing
Alvaro Alencar & Mauricio Iragorri – Assistant mixing

Charts

Weekly charts

Year-end charts

Singles

Certifications

Notes 

1996 albums
The Verve Pipe albums
RCA Records albums
Albums produced by Jerry Harrison